Warning to Wantons is a 1949 British romantic comedy film directed by Donald Wilson and starring Harold Warrender, Anne Vernon and David Tomlinson.

The screenplay, written by art historian James Laver and the director, was based upon Mary Mitchell's 1934 novel A Warning to Wantons, subtitled 'A fantastic romance - setting forth the not undeserved but awful fate which befell a minx.'

The film was one of the four of David Rawnsley's films that used his "independent frame" technique, a form of back projection.

Premise
A young woman escapes her strict convent school and enters high society, where she has the time of her life.

Cast
Credited
 Harold Warrender as Count Anton Kardak 
 Anne Vernon as Renee de Vaillant 
 David Tomlinson as Count Max Kardak 
 Sonia Holm as Maria 
 Hugh Cross as Pauli 
 Marie Burke as Therese 
 Judy Kelly as Mimi de Vaillant 
 Ellen Pollock as Baroness de Jammes 
 Andre Van Gyseghem as Oblensky 
 Bruce Belfrage as Archimandrite 
 Dennis Vance as Franklin Budd 
 Jack Melford as Maurice Lugard
 Brian Oulton as Gilbertier
Uncredited
 Stanley Ratcliffe as Baroud
 Aletha Orr as Mrs. Budd
 Claud Frederic as Padara
 Ida Patlanski as Mrs. Padera
 Olwen Brookes as Mdme. Bertrand
 Kenneth Firth as Achille
 John Warren (actor) as Grobner
 Mela White as Madeleine
 Alexander Field as Woodman
 Betty Thomas as Hortense
 Frank Cochrane as Gaston
 Nancy Roberts as Mother Superior
 Grace Denbigh Russell as Nurse
 Margaret Damer as 1st Nun
 Harriet Petworth as 2nd Nun
 Michael Balzagette as Ticket Collector
 Patricia Davidson as 1st Maid
 David Keir as Concierge
 Herbert C. Walton as Quarry Peasant
 Peter Faber as Page
 Pauline Loring as 1st Female Relative
 Vincent Ball as Earl (Footman)

Production
It was the first of four films produced by Donald Wilson using prefabricated sets to keep costs down. Filming took six weeks.

Critical reception
TV Guide called the film a "A spirited romantic comedy," and rated it two out of four stars.

References

External links

1949 films
British romantic comedy films
Films shot at Pinewood Studios
British black-and-white films
1949 romantic comedy films
1940s English-language films
1940s British films